It's About Time is the ninth studio album by the American band Chic released on September 28, 2018 through Virgin EMI Records. It was written and conducted by Chic guitarist Nile Rodgers.  It’s About Time  is the first album to be released in over two decades for the group, and is the first Chic album to not feature founding member Bernard Edwards who died in 1996. Originally scheduled for a 2015 release, heralded by the single "I'll Be There", the album concept kept changing and the release delayed for three years, partly due to the deaths of Prince and David Bowie. Eventually released on Virgin EMI Records in September 2018, the album cover is a homage to the group’s 1977 self titled debut album Chic. The lead single, "Till the World Falls", featuring Mura Masa, Cosha and Vic Mensa, was released on June 22, 2018.

According to Rodgers, It's About Time is the first of two albums that make up the "new Chic experience". The second album Executive Realness was originally scheduled for February 2019, and will "bring to a close the journey of Chic". It was later postponed to May 2019, but it was unreleased. As of December 2021, nothing is confirmed for the tenth and final album. One of the songs, "I Believe In Music", was broadcast on the BBC, but never released.

Critical reception

It's About Time received generally positive reviews from music critics. At Metacritic, which assigns a normalized rating out of 100 to reviews from mainstream critics, the album has an average score of 64 based on seven reviews, indicating "generally favorable reviews".

The album earned Chic a nomination for the Brit Award for International Group at the 2019 Brit Awards.

Track listing

Notes
  signifies an additional producer.

Charts

References

External links
 
  on NileRodgers.com

2018 albums
Chic (band) albums
Albums produced by Nile Rodgers
Albums produced by Mura Masa
Virgin EMI Records albums
Albums produced by Danny L Harle